Liku is one of the fourteen villages of Niue, located close to the easternmost part of the island. It lies due east of the capital, Alofi, and its population at the 2017 census was 98.

Geography
Liku is connected to the capital by a road which traverses the centre of the island. It is also - along with Lakepa, six kilometres to the north and Hakupu, 10 kilometres to the south - one of three villages on the east coast road which connects Vaiea in the south with Mutalau on the north coast.

Administration
Liku is one of the fourteen constituencies in Niue, electing one representative to the Niue Assembly. Following the 2008 general election, its representative is Pokotoa Sipeli, who serves as Minister of Post and Telecommunications, Minister of Agriculture, Forestry and Fisheries, and Minister of Administrative Services.

Notable residents
 Nahega Molifai Silimaka
 John Pule

References

Populated places in Niue